Minuscule 854 (in the Gregory-Aland numbering), Θε39 (von Soden), is a 13th-century Greek minuscule manuscript of the New Testament on paper. The manuscript has complex content.

Description 

The codex contains the text of the four Gospels on 467 paper leaves (size ). The text is written in one column per page, 28 lines per page.

It contains a commentary of Theophylact's authorship.

Text 
The Greek text of the codex is a representative of the Byzantine text-type with a mixture of other text-types. Kurt Aland did not place it in any Category.

According to the Claremont Profile Method it represents textual cluster 2148 in Luke 1 and Luke 20. In Luke 10 it represents textual family Kx.

History 

According to the colophon the manuscript was written in 1286.

The manuscript was added to the list of New Testament manuscripts by F. H. A. Scrivener (666e) and C. R. Gregory (854e). Gregory saw it in 1886.

Currently the manuscript is housed at the Vatican Library (Gr. 641), in Rome.

See also 

 List of New Testament minuscules
 Biblical manuscript
 Textual criticism
 Similar manuscripts
 Minuscule 855
 Minuscule 856

References

Further reading

External links 
 

Greek New Testament minuscules
13th-century biblical manuscripts
Manuscripts of the Vatican Library